Donatella Turri (born Maria Donatella Turri Gandolfi; 1945) is an Italian actress.

Biography 
Turri was born in Palmanova in 1945.

Filmography
 Les Adolescentes (1960)
 The Passionate Thief (1960)
 Che gioia vivere (1961)
 A Girl... and a Million   (1962) as Rossella Rubinacci
 Le gendarme se marie (1968)

References

External links 

Italian film actresses
Italian television actresses 
1945 births
People from Palmanova
Living people